Chlorocypha neptunus is a species of jewel damselfly in the family Chlorocyphidae.

The IUCN conservation status of Chlorocypha neptunus is "VU", vulnerable. The species faces a high risk of endangerment in the medium term. The IUCN status was reviewed in 2018.

References

Further reading

 

Chlorocyphidae
Articles created by Qbugbot
Insects described in 1899